Pop Pop is an album by the American musician Rickie Lee Jones, released in September 1991.

The album contains cover versions, ranging from jazz and blues standards to Tin Pan Alley to Jimi Hendrix's "Up from the Skies". It reached No. 8 on the Billboard Contemporary Jazz Albums and No. 121 on the Billboard 200.

Production
The album was coproduced by David Was and Jones. Charlie Haden played bass on some of its tracks. The cover artwork resembles a package of bang snaps.

Critical reception

The New York Times wrote that Jones's "vocal eccentricities, her swoops and shudders and pucker-sweet coos, seem at odds with the material rather than complicitous." The Calgary Herald noted that "Jones's plaintive, muttering, whispering little-girl voice weaves a web of intimacy around the listener... Still, it's not for every taste."

Track listing
"My One and Only Love" (Guy Wood, Robert Mellin) – 5:55
"Spring Can Really Hang You Up the Most" (Fran Landesman, Tommy Wolf) – 3:57
"Hi-Lili, Hi-Lo" (Bronisław Kaper, Helen Deutsch) – 3:38
"Up from the Skies" (Jimi Hendrix) – 4:32
"The Second Time Around" (Jimmy Van Heusen, Sammy Cahn) – 4:50
"Dat Dere" (Bobby Timmons, Oscar Brown, Jr.) – 4:07
"I'll Be Seeing You" (Irving Kahal, Sammy Fain) – 3:14
"Bye Bye Blackbird" (Mort Dixon, Ray Henderson) – 2:22
"The Ballad of the Sad Young Men" (Fran Landesman, Tommy Wolf) – 4:22
"I Won't Grow Up" (Carolyn Leigh, Mark Charlap) – 3:11
"Love Junkyard" (David Weiss, John Keller) – 4:11
"Comin' Back to Me" (Marty Balin) – 5:35

Personnel
Rickie Lee Jones, vocals; acoustic guitar on "Comin' Back to Me"
Robben Ford - acoustic guitar
Charlie Haden, John Leftwich - acoustic bass
Walfredo Reyes, Jr. - bongos, shakers
Bob Sheppard - clarinet on "I'll Be Seeing You", tenor saxophone on "Love Junkyard"
Joe Henderson - tenor saxophone on "Dat Dere" and "Bye Bye Blackbird"
Dino Saluzzi - bandoneon on "My One and Only Love", "Hi-Lili Hi-Lo" and "The Ballad of the Sad Young Men"
Charlie Shoemake - vibraphone on "Love Junkyard"
Steven Kindler - violin on "Second Time Around"
David Was - percussion, background vocals
Michael O'Neill - acoustic guitar on "Up From The Skies" and "Love Junkyard"
Michael Greiner - hurdy-gurdy on "Comin' Back to Me"
April Gay, Arnold McCuller, David Was, Donny Gerrard, Terry Bradford - backing vocals

Technical 
Greg Penny, John Eden, Jon Ingoldsby - engineer
Kevin Reagan - art direction, design
Pascal Nabet Meyer - Executive Producer

References

Rickie Lee Jones albums
1991 albums
Geffen Records albums
Albums produced by David Was
Covers albums
Traditional pop albums